Lice (pronounced ), is a Kurdish-populated town in Diyarbakır Province in Turkey. The population was 9,644 in 2010. In the local elections in March 2019 Tarık Mercan from the Peoples' Democratic Party (HDP) was elected mayor. As the current District Governor was appointed Cevdet Bakkal.

History 
Lice was the headquarters of the 5th Army Corps of the Turkish army during the Sheikh Said rebellion in 1925 and it was a focal point at the beginning of the rebellion. The town was captured on the 20 February by the troops loyal to Sheikh Said. The Kurdish Zirki tribe in the Lice district also supported the Sheik Said rebellion and as a reprisal, the tribes villages Çaylarbaşı, Kurlu, Alataş, Mat-bur and Çağlayan have been demolished and the residing population was killed by troops of the Turkish army. It was reported that the troops of the Turkish Major Ali Haydar have wiped out the majority of the Sheikhs.      

On 6 September 1975, Lice was struck by an earthquake with a magnitude of  6.7. Around 1.500 people were killed in Lice according to the mayor.

The Kurdistan Workers' Party or PKK, was founded in the village of Fis, in Lice district on November 27, 1978.

The Lice massacre, during which the Turkish army demolished large parts of the town in reprisal of the death of an Jandarma officer, took place from October 20–23, 1993. 

Between 2018 and 2019 localities in the Lice district have often been targeted with curfews declared by the Turkish authorities, which wanted to execute security operations in the district. 

The Kurdish castle of Ataq used to exist near the modern Lice.

References

Populated places in Diyarbakır Province
Districts of Diyarbakır Province
Kurdish settlements in Turkey